Glenferrie Road is a major north–south thoroughfare in Melbourne, Australia. It runs from Kew to Caulfield North, and includes major shopping districts at both Hawthorn and Malvern. There are a number of rail transport options on Glenferrie Road and also some landmarks.

Route
Glenferrie Road starts at the intersection with Cotham Road as a dual-lane, single-carriageway road, sharing tram tracks along its entire length, heading south under the Lilydale railway line through Hawthorn, under CityLink tollway and across the Glen Waverley railway line in Kooyong, over the Frankston railway line in Malvern and eventually ending at Dandenong Road on the northern edge of Caulfield North.

History
Glenferrie Road was named after Glen Ferrie, a 1840s property south of Gardiners Creek, owned by Peter Ferrie. Glenferrie Road was planned in 1839 and officially opened in 1863. In 1860 the council wished to build the council building on Glenferrie Road; despite petitions from the public, it was opened in February 1862. By the 1880s there were a number of shops on Glenferrie Road.

Glenferrie Road was signed as Metropolitan Route 19 between Kew and Malvern in 1965. Metropolitan Route 19 continues south, with a brief concurrency along Dandenong Road, via Hawthorn Road eventually to Black Rock.

The passing of the Road Management Act 2004 granted the responsibility of overall management and development of Victoria's major arterial roads to VicRoads: in 2004, VicRoads re-declared the road as Glenferrie Road (Arterial #5310), beginning at Cotham Road at Kew and ending at Dandenong Road in Caulfield North.

Transport
Tram route 16 runs along the entire length of Glenferrie Road. The Malvern tram depot is also located on Glenferrie Road, serving routes 5, 6, 58 and 72. Three railway stations are each located on Glenferrie Road: Glenferrie, serving the Lilydale line in Hawthorn; Kooyong, serving the Glen Waverley line in Kooyong; and Malvern, serving the Frankston line, in Malvern.

Landmarks
The Kooyong Tennis Stadium, the original home of the Australian Open, is located on Glenferrie Road, as are Stonnington House, formerly the Toorak Campus of Deakin University (and Government House, Melbourne from 1901 to 1927) and the biggest campus of the Swinburne University of Technology. Malvern Town Hall, housing Stonnington City Council (seat of the local government area of the City of Stonnington), is located on the corner of High Street in Malvern.

References

External links

Glenferrie Road Hawthorn Traders Association
Glenferrie Road Malvern

Streets in Melbourne
Shopping districts and streets in Australia
Transport in the City of Boroondara
Transport in the City of Stonnington